The vice-president of Zimbabwe is the second highest political position obtainable in Zimbabwe. Currently there is a provision for two vice-presidents, who are appointed by the president of Zimbabwe. The vice-presidents are designated as "First" and "Second" in the Constitution of Zimbabwe; the designation reflects their position in the presidential order of succession.

Under the ruling ZANU–PF party, the vice-presidential post ranked first in the order of succession has traditionally been reserved for a representative of the party's historical ZANU wing (mainly ethnic Shona), while the other vice-presidential post has gone to a representative of the party's historical ZAPU wing (mainly ethnic Northern Ndebele).

List vice-presidents

Political parties

Symbols
 Died in office

First vice-presidents

Second vice-presidents

Rank by time in office

First vice-presidents

Second vice-presidents

See also
President of Zimbabwe
Prime Minister of Zimbabwe
List of current vice presidents

Notes

References

Zimbabwe
Zimbabwe
 
Lists of political office-holders in Zimbabwe